Herbert Louis Stock Sr. (September 3, 1899 – December 21, 1987) was an American football halfback who played one season in the National Football League (NFL) for the Columbus Tigers and three for the independent Ironton Tanks.

Early life and education
Stock was born on September 3, 1899, in Columbus, Ohio. He attended Commerce High School in Ohio, along with three other people who would later play professionally. In 1918, he joined Kenyon College in Gambier, Ohio, where he attended one year before serving as a member of the United States Army during World War I. He returned to the school in 1920, and earned a varsity letter in the following three seasons. The Democratic Banner reported, "Herbert L. Stock of Columbus on Saturday was unanimously elected captain of the 1922 football team of Kenyon. Stock has completed his second year on the varsity and has been reckoned Ohio's best fullback by several noted sport authorities."

Professional career
In 1924, two years after his last season of college football, Stock was given a position on the Columbus Tigers National Football League (NFL) team, becoming one of two Kenyon attendees ever to play professionally. He was given the team's starting halfback position, but he played several other positions as well, including defensive back, tailback, blocking back, fullback, linebacker, and wingback. In the season, he played in between 6 and 7 games, starting five. The Tigers finished 4–4 that season, and placed tenth in the NFL.

Following the season Stock left the Columbus Tigers, and joined the independent Ironton Tanks. He played the following three years with the team before retiring.

Death
Stock died on December 21, 1987, in his hometown of Columbus, Ohio, at the age of 88.

References

External links

1899 births
1988 deaths
American football defensive backs
American football halfbacks
American football fullbacks
American football linebackers
Kenyon Lords football players
Players of American football from Columbus, Ohio
Columbus Tigers players
Ironton Tanks players
United States Army personnel of World War I